Archive Things 1982–88 is a compilation of Jack Dangers early work, much of which was issued in very limited editions.

Track listing
CD 1
Meat Beat Manifesto: "Guitarworks" - 4:43
Meat Beat Manifesto: "1234" - 2:02
Meat Beat Manifesto: "West Window" - 1:13
Meat Beat Manifesto: "Falling" - 1:56
Meat Beat Manifesto: "B.R.E.L." - 7:12
Meat Beat Manifesto: "International Disease" - 5:28
Meat Beat Manifesto: "Dirty Ray" - 4:21
Meat Beat Manifesto: "I Got The Fear" - 5:03
Meat Beat Manifesto: "Design For Living" - 6:10
Meat Beat Manifesto: "Kneel And Buzz" - 4:18
Meat Beat Manifesto: "Untitled 5" - 4:58
Meat Beat Manifesto: "Snareworks" - 1:40
Meat Beat Manifesto: "Synthesizer Test" - 4:30
Producer - Andy Partridge
Meat Beat Manifesto: "Lid Locks" - 6:13
Space Children: "Let's Go Disco 7"" - 3:58
CD 2
All songs by Perennial Divide
"Blow" - 4:33
"Parricide" - 2:21
"Word Of The Lord" - 4:19
"Captain Swing" - 4:33
"Rescue" - 5:00
"The Fall" - 5:32
"Trip" - 4:56
"Tuna Hell" - 1:13
"Burning Dogs" - 5:49
"End Of The Line" - 5:20
"Burn Down 7"" - 4:23
"Permanent Way 7" (4:04
"Beehead 7"" - 4:11
"Leathernecks 7"" - 4:22
Engineer - Colin James, Jack Dangers
Remix - MBM
"E.C.T. 7"" - 4:32
Engineer - Colin James, Jack Dangers
MBM

References
Discogs entry: 
Brainwashed.com: 

Jack Dangers albums